Wells Fargo Center (originally Independent Life Building) is a skyscraper in the downtown area of Jacksonville, Florida, at the southeast corner of Bay and Laura streets. It was formerly known as the Modis Building until 2011, when Wells Fargo acquired the naming rights.

History

The tower was completed in 1974 by the Independent Life and Accident Insurance Company, and was known as the Independent Life Building. Built by The Auchter Company. It was designed by KBJ Architects, who received the Honor Award for Outstanding Achievement in Design by the Jacksonville Chapter of the American Institute of Architects for the design. The design concept included a sloping base and large corner frames to provide a distinctive image not only for the company, but also as an identifying landmark for the city of Jacksonville.

Beginning in 1995 Independent Life was acquired by the American General Life Insurance Company, and operations were gradually moved to Nashville, Tennessee. The building was sold to Associated Capital Properties, and the Jacksonville staffing company AccuStaff moved in and acquired the naming rights, and it became the AccuStaff Building. In 2002, AccuStaff changed its name to MPS Group. It renamed the building the Modis Building, after one of the company's main brands, and added Modis signage. In 2009 MPS Group was acquired by the Swiss firm Adecco Group, which announced the company would relocate to Jacksonville's suburbs. The move was completed in 2011 and the signage was removed, and the building was renamed Independent Square.

In May 2011, Wells Fargo, which had acquired the Wachovia financial services company, announced it would relocate local employees to the building. Signage went up on the Wells Fargo Center on September 26 and the relocation completed by April 2012.

Description and tenants
The Wells Fargo Center has 37 floors, and held the title of tallest building in Florida until 1981, when One Tampa City Center was completed. It remained the tallest building in Jacksonville until 1990, when the Bank of America Tower surpassed it in height. The building takes up an entire city block in Jacksonville's downtown. A notable feature of the structure is a four-story atrium of tropical vegetation where the public enters. The first floor also contained an auditorium with seating for 360 patrons, a bank, restaurants, and several retail stores.

Parkway Properties is a third-party service provider for the building.

The River Club

One major tenant in the Wells Fargo Center is the River Club of Jacksonville, a private business club that occupies the top two floors of the building. Originally known as the Jacksonville Businessmen's Club, it was established in 1954 after the fashion of similar organizations in New York City, Chicago and Washington, D.C. It was formerly located on the 16th floor of the Prudential Building (now known as the Aetna Building), the city's tallest building when it opened in 1955. It relocated to its current space in 1976, but did not offer memberships to women until 1985. The club has been owned and managed by a subsidiary of Gate Petroleum since 2003.

In September 2017, Hurricane Irma's storm surge caused major flooding in the downtown area of Jacksonville. The parking garage of the Wells Fargo Center was impacted by these events and the building was briefly closed.  The building reopened September 29.

Gallery

See also
Architecture of Jacksonville
 List of tallest buildings in Jacksonville
List of tallest buildings in Florida
 Downtown Jacksonville

References

External links
Jacksonville River Club website

1974 establishments in Florida
Architecture in Jacksonville, Florida
Downtown Jacksonville
Jacksonville Modern architecture
KBJ Architects buildings
Laura Street
Modernist architecture in Florida
Northbank, Jacksonville
Office buildings completed in 1974
Skyscraper office buildings in Jacksonville, Florida
Wells Fargo buildings